Phaeoses is a genus of moths belonging to the family Tineidae.

Species
Phaeoses amblyxena (Meyrick, 1920)
Phaeoses argoceros (Meyrick, 1937)
Phaeoses caenologa (Meyrick, 1915)
Phaeoses chalinota (Meyrick, 1910)
Phaeoses chloracma (Meyrick, 1907)
Phaeoses flabilis (Turner, 1923)
Phaeoses guppyi (Bradley, 1961)
Phaeoses horolyca (Meyrick, 1915)
Phaeoses leucodeta (Meyrick, 1914)
Phaeoses leucoprosopa (Turner, 1923)
Phaeoses lithacma (Meyrick, 1921)
Phaeoses meeki (Bradley, 1961)
Phaeoses pileigera (Meyrick, 1913)
Phaeoses sabinella Forbes, 1922

References

Hieroxestinae